Kennedy v. Bremerton School District, 597 U.S. ___ (2022), is a landmark decision by the United States Supreme Court in which the Court held, 6–3, that the government, while following the Establishment Clause, may not suppress an individual from engaging in personal religious observance, as doing so would violate the Free Speech and Free Exercise Clauses of the First Amendment.

The case involved Joseph Kennedy, a high school football coach in the public school system of Bremerton, Washington. Kennedy had taken the practice of praying at the middle of the field immediately after each game. The practice was soon joined by the players and others. The school board were concerned the practice would be seen as infringing on the Establishment Clause separating church and state. They attempted to negotiate with Kennedy to pray elsewhere or at a later time, but Kennedy continued the practice. His contract was not renewed, leading Kennedy to sue the board. Lower Courts, including the Ninth Circuit, ruled in favor of the school board and their argument regarding the Establishment Clause.

The majority opinion from the Supreme Court found that the Establishment Clause does not allow a government body to take a hostile view of religion in considering personal rights under the Free Speech and Free Exercise Clauses, ruling that the board acted improperly in not renewing Kennedy's contract. The decision all but overturned Lemon v. Kurtzman (1971) and abandoned the subsequent "Lemon test", which had been used to evaluate government actions within the scope of the Establishment Clause but had been falling out of favor for decades prior.

Background 
Joseph Kennedy is a practicing Christian and was an assistant football coach at Bremerton High School, a public school in Bremerton, Washington, starting in 2008. Inspired by the film Facing the Giants, Kennedy began praying after each football game, in the center of the field, at the 50-yard line. Over time, he was joined by his players, and then by players and coaches from the opposing team. Kennedy continued the practice for seven years, but the school board only learned of the practice after an opposing team commented positively that the district would allow for the practice. The board became concerned that they would be seen as complicit in violating the separation of church and state by allowing for Kennedy's prayers to continue, as well as the implicit coercion that players may feel to join in on the prayer. The board negotiated with Kennedy to reduce the public display of the prayer, offering to provide Kennedy with a private location for his prayer or suggesting that he held his prayer after the spectators had left, among other accommodations. Through the athletic director, Kennedy was warned that any such display should be clearly student-led. Kennedy wrote to his Facebook page that he felt he was likely being fired, and a few games later, he continued to pray after the game with additional coverage by the press and local politicians. Spectators knocked over members of the marching band while racing to join the prayer and directed profanity at Bremerton's head coach, who said he feared being "shot from the crowd." After Kennedy continued this prayer for two more games, the board put him on paid leave for violating the school's policies and endangering students. The board suggested to not renew Kennedy's annual contract, and Kennedy did not re-apply.

Lower courts 
Kennedy filed suit in the United States District Court for the Western District of Washington to regain his job, claiming the school's policy violated the Free Exercise Clause of the First Amendment. The board stated that they were trying to avoid any conflicts with the Establishment Clause by preventing public displays of faith at a public school. The district court ruled for the school board, and its decision was upheld at the Court of Appeals for the Ninth Circuit in an opinion by Judge Milan Smith. In 2019, the Supreme Court denied his first petition for a writ of certiorari, but Justice Alito, joined by Thomas, Gorsuch, and Kavanaugh, wrote, respecting the denial, but calling the case "troubling and may justify review in the future."

After conducting further fact-finding, the district court granted summary judgment in favor of the school district in March 2020. In March 2021, the Ninth Circuit again ruled for the school district on appeal. In July 2021, the full Ninth Circuit denied rehearing en banc. The Ninth Circuit was split in this denial; while Judge Milan Smith, writing for the majority in denying en banc, said that "Kennedy made it his mission to intertwine religion with football", Judge Diarmuid O'Scannlain in the dissenting opinion wrote that the majority went against Tinker v. Des Moines in that "It is axiomatic that teachers do not 'shed' their First Amendment protections ‘at the schoolhouse gate'."

Kennedy filed a petition for a writ of certiorari.

Supreme Court 
Certiorari was granted in the case on January 14, 2022. Oral arguments were held on April 25, 2022. According to Adam Liptak of The New York Times, the conservative majority of the Court appeared to favor Kennedy's arguments in the case though their questioning likely looked towards a narrow ruling that would not fully disrupt past case law on religion in public schools.

On June 27, 2022, the Supreme Court reversed the Ninth Circuit in a 6–3 vote. Justice Gorsuch wrote the majority opinion, while Justice Sotomayor wrote the dissenting opinion. Justices Thomas and Alito both wrote concurring opinions.

Opinion of the Court 
Justice Gorsuch wrote that the school's actions against Kennedy violated his rights under both the Free Speech and Free Exercise Clauses of the First Amendment. He further wrote "We are aware of no historically sound understanding of the Establishment Clause that begins to '(make) it necessary for government to be hostile to religion' in this way". Gorsuch's opinion stated that Kennedy "offered his prayers quietly while his students were otherwise occupied" and that he made "short, private, personal prayer". Gorsuch rejected the school district’s argument that it could prohibit Kennedy’s post-game prayers so that students did not feel compelled to join him in praying. Gorsuch noted that "There is no indication in the record ... that anyone expressed any coercion concerns to the District about the quiet, postgame prayers that Mr. Kennedy asked to continue and that led to his suspension.” Gorsuch distinguished this case from cases "in which this Court has found prayer involving public schools to be problematically coercive". Gorsuch reasoned that unlike those earlier cases, Kennedy’s prayers "were not publicly broadcast or recited to a captive audience" and students “were not required or expected to participate". Gorsuch concluded that the school district’s actions "rested on a mistaken view that it had a duty to ferret out and suppress religious observances even as it allows comparable secular speech", and that "The Constitution neither mandates nor tolerates that kind of discrimination".

Dissent
In the dissent, Justice Sotomayor criticized Gorsuch's interpretation of the facts of the case. Gorsuch had described the situation as 'Mr. Kennedy prayed during a period when school employees were free to speak with a friend, call for a reservation at a restaurant, check email, or attend to other personal matters. He offered his prayers quietly while his students were otherwise occupied." Sotomayor in the dissent wrote the situation as "The record reveals that Kennedy had a long-standing practice of conducting demonstrative prayers on the 50-yard line of the football field. Kennedy consistently invited others to join his prayers and for years led student-athletes in prayer at the same time and location. The court ignores this history. The court also ignores the severe disruption to school events caused by Kennedy’s conduct." Sotomayor also described the implicit coercion from peer pressure that had been demonstrated in the lower courts' proceedings. Sotomayor summarized these points as "To the degree the court portrays petitioner Joseph Kennedy’s prayers as private and quiet, it misconstrues the facts." Sotomayor also wrote that the Supreme Court "has consistently recognized that school officials leading prayer is constitutionally impermissible." The majority ruling, she wrote, "charts a different path, yet again paying almost exclusive attention to the Free Exercise Clause’s protection for individual religious exercise while giving short shrift to the Establishment Clause’s prohibition on state establishment of religion".

Sotomayor included several photographs in her dissent, which is highly unusual for Court opinions.

Impact 
The majority reasoning appears to effectively overturn Lemon v. Kurtzman, which had established a three-part Lemon test to determine if a government statute or similar action violated the Establishment Clause. While the Lemon test was popular in courts in the 1970s, it had lost favor starting in the 1980s, and continued to so even after Justice Sandra Day O'Connor had refined the test in Agostini v. Felton. The Supreme Court had most recently considered the Lemon test in American Legion v. American Humanist Association, where several members of the Court rejected the use of the Lemon test. Within Kennedy, the majority opinion did not explicitly overturn Lemon, but stated that they used a history-based approach "in place of Lemon and the endorsement test". Justice Sotomayor's dissent further establishes that the majority opinion "overrules" Lemon, and "calls into question decades of subsequent precedents that it deems offshoots".

An analysis by Ian Millhiser of Vox suggests that the decision's impact may be limited, as the opinion's description of Kennedy's actions as "private" would have already been permissible under Lee v. Weisman.

Some religious groups claim the decision allows for school prayer, but other legal analysts find no support for the overturning of Abington School District v. Schempp, which disallows public school teachers from leading students in prayer. The Court in Kennedy found that Kennedy had not required or asked students to join him, but had instead joined him voluntarily, and thus was not a violation of Schempp. However these analyses did affirm that the design allows a teacher to pray quietly on their own or with other teachers.

Kennedy was reinstated to his previous position as assistant football coach for the Bremerton school by March 2023.

References

Further reading

External links 
 

2022 in United States case law
United States Supreme Court cases
United States Supreme Court cases of the Roberts Court
Establishment Clause case law
United States free exercise of religion case law
United States Free Speech Clause case law